The Saronic Islands or Argo-Saronic Islands is an archipelago in Greece, named after the Saronic Gulf in which they are located, just off the Greek mainland. The main inhabited islands of this group are Salamis, Aegina, Agistri, and Poros. The islands of Hydra and Dokos, which lie off the northeast tip of the Peloponnese (technically between the Saronic Gulf and the Argolic Gulf), are sometimes included as part of the Saronic Islands.

Many mainland Greeks have vacation homes in the Saronic Islands, which are regularly served by ferries from the Athen's port of Piraeus and the Peloponnese. Salamis, the largest island of the group, is where the ancient Greek navy defeated the Persians in the Battle of Salamis.

Main islands

See also
List of islands of Greece

References

 
Saronic Gulf
Landforms of Islands (regional unit)
Archipelagoes of Greece
Aegean islands